Laurent Meunier (born January 16, 1979) is a French-born Swiss former professional ice hockey player who spent most of his career in Switzerland playing in the National League (NL) and the Swiss League (SL). He also captained the French National team for 13 years, the longest serving captain of a national sporting team in the world. 

Meunier currently co-hosts hockey TV show, Le Repas d'équipe, with fellow French-born Swiss former goaltender Cristobal Huet on MySports.

Career

International retirement
In May 2017, Meunier played at the 2017 IIHF World Championship, in Paris, representing France, as lead team captain. This represented his swan song, and he retired from the national team after finishing the tournament. He played his last game at the final round robin game of France, against Slovenia, with a win, retiring with France's Lead Goaltender Cristobal Huet. Team France (Les Bleus) did not advance to the medal round, but was not relegated.

Awards and honors

Career statistics

Regular season and playoffs

International

References

External links

1979 births
Living people
HC Ajoie players
Brûleurs de Loups players
Florida Everblades players
French ice hockey centres
HC Fribourg-Gottéron players
Genève-Servette HC players
Ice hockey players at the 2002 Winter Olympics
HC La Chaux-de-Fonds players
Lausanne HC players
LHC Les Lions players
Olympic ice hockey players of France
People from Saint-Martin-d'Hères
Sportspeople from Isère
Straubing Tigers players
Timrå IK players
UMass Lowell River Hawks men's ice hockey players